Bettinus is a lunar impact crater located near the southwest limb. Due to its location, the crater has a distinctly oval shape because of foreshortening. To the south of the rim is the similar-sized crater Kircher, and to the northwest is the slightly smaller Zucchius. From the west to the southwest, closer to the limb, is the giant formation Bailly.

The rim of Bettinus is only somewhat worn, with an inner wall that is wider to the northwest. The interior floor is relatively flat, with a central rise that is offset to the west of the midpoint. There is a small crater along the eastern rim.

Bettinus lies due south of the Schiller-Zucchius Basin.

Satellite craters
By convention these features are identified on lunar maps by placing the letter on the side of the crater midpoint that is closest to Bettinus.

References

 
 
 
 
 
 
 
 
 
 
 
 

Impact craters on the Moon